"Signals Over the Air" is the first single from War All the Time and the first major label single from the band, Thursday, reaching No. 30 on the Billboard Alternative Songs chart. It also became Thursday's largest hit in the United Kingdom, reaching No. 62 on the UK Singles Chart.

"Signals Over the Air" was released to radio on August 12, 2003. It is performed at most live Thursday shows, usually with vocalist Geoff Rickly explaining that the song is about sexual revolution; during the tour following War All the Time, an extended introduction was played before the song. This introduction was recorded as part of the Live from the SoHo & Santa Monica Stores split EP; a live acoustic version of single the song was used on Y100 Sonic Sessions Volume 8, taken from a live radio session recorded by the band in November 2003 at Indre Studios in Philadelphia. A radio edit exists as well, removing much of the bridge near the end of the song.

To correspond with the release of War All the Time, Thursday released a video discussing the track. Rickly comments that sexuality used to be talked about in punk rock songs, but it is now seen as taboo. He continues that the song is about gender issues and discussing sexuality in a nonnegative way; he also states that the song is about coming to terms with his own sexual identity, saying he doesn't feel an affinity for male culture such as The Man Show. Rickly relates a story where a gay man used the song to help him, even though people would call him faggot. Rickly states that he has always enjoyed songs like PJ Harvey's "Man Size".

Chart performance

References 

Thursday (band) songs
2003 singles
2003 songs
2000s ballads
Island Records singles
LGBT-related songs
Rock ballads